Bura, Kenya may refer to:
 Bura, Tana River County, Kenya
 Bura, Taita-Taveta County, Kenya